Matt Land (born February 10, 1972) is the athletic director and former head football coach for Trine University. 2006 was his first season as the program's head coach. The team finished 2–8. In 2007, they finished with a record of 6–4.  In 2008 he was awarded the NCAA Division III Co-Region Four Coach of the Year award after leading Trine to a 10–0 regular season. In April 2012, Land was named the athletic director at Trine.

Land was also the head coach for the United Indoor Football league's Fort Wayne Freedom in 2005, and Fort Wayne's South Side High School from 2002 to 2005, each year he built up the team a little bit more until his last year in 2005 when he coached the team to its winningest season ever, including a sectional championship victory over Bishop Dwenger High School, a Class 4A regional victory over Delta High School. The Archers lost in the semi-state to Lowell, the eventual Class 4A state champs. 
He was also the wrestling coach for Northrop High School. Land was part of a rebuilding process at South Side High School, in which he built a team that was 7–20 in three years prior to his arrival, and a 21–11 record in the following three seasons.

Head coaching record

College

References

External links
 Trine profile

1972 births
Living people
Trine Thunder athletic directors
Trine Thunder football coaches
High school football coaches in Indiana
High school wrestling coaches in the United States
Ball State University alumni
Sportspeople from Fort Wayne, Indiana